Kentucky Route 139 (KY 139) is a  state highway in Kentucky that runs from Tennessee State Route 120 at the Tennessee state line south of Cadiz to Kentucky Route 120 in rural Crittenden County north of Princeton via Cadiz and Princeton.

Route description
KY 120 begins at the Tennessee state line just west of the Fort Campbell Military Reservation. Its first city it goes through is Cadiz, where it intersects the concurrent U.S. Route 68 (US 68) and KY 80, as well as US 68's business loop in downtown Cadiz. After entering Caldwell County, it then intersects Interstate 24 (I-24) where north of the ramp is the frontage roads, KY 6059 and KY 6060. South from that, at the point where Trigg County meets with Caldwell and Lyon counties.

At Princeton, KY 139 runs concurrently with US 62 and KY 91. KY 91/KY 139 together turns right on the west side of town and then intersects with Interstate 69 (I-69). KY 139 turns off KY 91 and then goes due north to intersect KY 700 in northern Caldwell County. Then KY 139 ends at a junction with KY 120 in rural southeastern Crittenden County just west of the Tradewater River.

Major intersections

References

External links
KY 139 at Kentucky Roads

0139
Transportation in Trigg County, Kentucky
Transportation in Caldwell County, Kentucky
Transportation in Crittenden County, Kentucky